Useless Trinkets: B-Sides, Soundtracks, Rarities and Unreleased 1996–2006 is a rarities compilation to celebrate the tenth anniversary of rock band Eels, featuring a live performance DVD from Lollapalooza 2006, behind-the-scenes photos, and commentary by lead singer Mark Oliver Everett. It was released on January 15, 2008 in the United States and on January 21, 2008 in the United Kingdom, where it debuted on the UK Album Chart at #69.

It was released in conjunction with the greatest hits collection Meet the Eels: Essential Eels, Vol. 1 (1996–2006).

Track listing

CDs
All songs written by E, except where noted:
CD 1
"Novocaine for the Soul" (Live from Hell) (E and Mark Goldenberg) – 3:18
"Fucker" – 2:17
"My Beloved Monster" (Live from Tennessee) – 2:32
"Dog's Life" – 3:59
"Susan's Apartment" (E, Jim Jacobsen, and Jim Weatherly) – 3:29
"Manchester Girl" (Live on the BBC) – 3:21
"Flower" (Live on the BBC) – 3:17
"My Beloved Mad Monster Party" (Live on the BBC) – 2:33
"Animal" (E and Jim Lang) – 2:39
"Stepmother" – 2:51
"Everything's Gonna Be Cool This Christmas" – 2:51
"Your Lucky Day in Hell" (Michael Simpson remix) (E and Goldenberg) – 3:57
"Altar Boy" (Rickie Lee Jones) – 2:14
"Novocaine for the Soul" (The Moog Cookbook remix) (E and Goldenberg) – 3:10
"If I Was Your Girlfriend" (Live) (Prince) – 4:34
"Bad News" (Sally Dworsky and E) – 2:56
"Funeral Parlor" – 2:12
"Hospital Food" (Live on the BBC) (Butch, E, and Lang) – 3:24
"Open the Door" (BBC) (Linda Hopper and Ruthie Morris) – 3:04
"Birdgirl on a Cell Phone" – 3:08
"Vice President Fruitley" (Butch, E, and Lisa Germano) – 2:17
"My Beloved Monstrosity" – 2:13
"The Dark End of the Street" (Live) (Dan Penn and Chips Moman) – 2:35
"The Cheater's Guide to Your Heart" (Live) – 2:39
"Useless Trinkets" – 2:22

CD 2
"Mr. E's Beautiful Remix" (E and Simpson) – 3:54
"Souljacker part I" (Alternate version) (Butch, E, and Adam Siegel) – 3:04
"Dog Faced Boy" (Alternate version) (E and John Parish) – 2:54
"Jennifer Eccles" (Allan Clarke and Graham Nash) – 3:20
"Rotten World Blues" – 2:45
"Can't Help Falling in Love" (Luigi Creatore, Hugo Peretti, and George David Weiss) – 2:08
"Christmas Is Going to the Dogs" – 2:58
"Mighty Fine Blues" – 3:26
"Eyes Down" – 3:32
"Skywriting" – 2:07
"Taking a Bath in Rust" – 2:28
"Estranged Friends" (E and Koool G Murder) – 3:21
"Her" – 2:48
"Waltz of the Naked Clowns" – 2:47
"I Like Birds" (Live) – 2:36
"Sad Foot Sign" – 2:19
"Living Life" (Daniel Johnston) – 2:49
"The Bright Side" (Peter Buck and E) – 3:42
"After the Operation" – 1:55
"Jelly Dancers" (Bruce Haack and Esther Nelson) – 4:38
"I Could Never Take the Place of Your Man" (Live at Town Hall) (Prince) – 3:37
"Mr. E's Beautiful Blues" (Live at Town Hall) (E and Simpson) – 3:04
"I Want to Protect You" – 3:09
"I Put a Spell on You" (Live) (Screamin' Jay Hawkins) – 2:21
"Saw a UFO" – 4:37

DVD
"Saturday Morning"
"Eyes Down"
"My Beloved Monster"
"From Which I Came/A Magic World"
"Not Ready Yet"
"Souljacker part I"

Origin of tracks
1:1 – Beautiful Freak German edition bonus disc & French "Rags to Rags" EP/single (both 1997)
1:2 and 1:3 – "Novocaine for the Soul" single (1996)
1:4 – Welcome to Woop Woop soundtrack (1998)
1:5 – "Your Lucky Day in Hell" single; "Beautiful Freak" single (1997)
1:6, 1:7, and 1:8 – Beautiful Freak German edition bonus disc (1997)
1:9 – "Rags to Rags" single (1996)
1:10 – "Susan's House" single (1997)
1:11 – "Cancer for the Cure" single (1998)
1:12 – Promo singles (1997 & 1998)
1:13 – "Your Lucky Day in Hell" single; "Beautiful Freak" single (1997)
1:14 – "Last Stop: This Town" single (1998)
1:15 – Previously unreleased
1:16 – The End of Violence soundtrack (1997)
1:17 – "Last Stop: This Town" single (1998)
1:18 – "Mr. E's Beautiful Blues" single (2000)
1:19 – "Flyswatter" single (2000)
1:20 – "Mr. E's Beautiful Blues" single (2000)
1:21 – "Flyswatter" single (2000)
1:22 – "Souljacker part I" single (2001)
1:23, 1:24 and 1:25 – Previously unreleased
2:1 – 22 Miles of Hard Road EP
2:2 and 2:3 – Previously unreleased
2:4 – Sing Hollies in Reverse tribute album (1995 – as E); "Souljacker part I" single (2001)
2:5 – 22 Miles of Hard Road/Rotten World Blues EP
2:6 – "Souljacker part I" single (2001)
2:7 – Dr. Seuss' How the Grinch Stole Christmas soundtrack (2000)
2:8 and 2:9 – Holes soundtrack (2003)
2:10 and 2:11 – Levity soundtrack (2003)
2:12 – Previously unreleased
2:13 and 2:14 – "Saturday Morning" single (2003)
2:15 – Previously unreleased
2:16 – "Saturday Morning" single (2003)
2:17 – The Late Great Daniel Johnston: Discovered Covered (2004)
2:18 and 2:19 – "Hey Man (Now You're Really Living)" single (2005)
2:20 – Dimension Mix (2005)
2:21 and 2:22 – iTunes Store-edition of Eels with Strings: Live at Town Hall (2006)
2:23 – "I Want to Protect You" single (2006)
2:24 and 2:25 – Previously unreleased

Advertisement controversy
Eels attempted to run a one-second edit of their seven-second ad during the television broadcast of the 2008 Super Bowl to promote Useless Trinkets, but were denied by the National Football League. Lead singer E reported: "In the end we were told that the NFL would have to find 29 other advertisers to buy 1 second spots to fill a standard 30 second advertising slot and that they do not sell advertising time by the second. They also noted that a rapid fire 30 second segment of thirty 1 second commercials could cause people with certain medical conditions to have seizures and that it was against network regulations."

References

External links
Eels page on the compilations

B-side compilation albums
Eels (band) compilation albums
Eels (band) video albums
Live video albums
2008 compilation albums
2008 live albums
DreamWorks Records compilation albums
DreamWorks Records live albums
DreamWorks Records video albums
Eels (band) live albums
Universal Records compilation albums
Universal Records video albums
Universal Records live albums
Albums produced by Mark Oliver Everett